John Smibert (rarely spelled Smybert; ; 24 March 1688 – 2 April 1751) was a Scottish-born painter, regarded as the first academically trained artist to live and work regularly in British America.

Career
Born in Edinburgh on 24 March 1688, Smibert was the second youngest of six children of Alison and John Smibert, a litster, or wool dyer. From 1702–1709, he was apprenticed to a house painter and plasterer in Edinburgh. On moving to London in 1709 he worked as a coach painter and copyist.

1713-1716, he studied under Godfrey Kneller at the Great Queen Street Academy, then returned to Edinburgh, seeking work as portraitist. 
Smibert travelled to Italy from 1719 to 1722 to copy old masters and then settled in London where he worked as a portrait painter from 1722 until 1728.

Smibert became a member of the Rose and Crown Club and made a sketch for a group portrait of its members, including George Vertue, John Wootton, Thomas Gibson, Bernard Lens III, and others.

Among his London portraits is one of Bishop Berkeley who, in 1728, enticed Smibert to accompanied him to America, with the intention of becoming professor of fine arts in the college which Berkeley was planning to found in Bermuda. The college, however, was never established, and Smibert settled in Boston, where he married in 1730. He lived at the corner of Brattle Street and Queen-Street. He belonged to the Scots Charitable Society of Boston.

In 1728, he began painting Dean George Berkeley and His Entourage, also called The Bermuda Group, which became one of the most influential New England portraits. 
It was commissioned by John Wainright, a patron of George Berkeley, and depicts the members of the planned expedition to Bermuda. The painting, now in the Yale University Art Gallery, includes Berkeley at the right, Wainwright seated at left, and Smibert standing at the far left.

Smibert painted portraits of Jonathan Edwards and Judge Edmund Quincy (in the Museum of Fine Arts in Boston), Mrs Smibert, Peter Faneuil and Governor John Endecott (in the Massachusetts Historical Society), John Lovell (Memorial Hall, Harvard University), and probably one of Sir William Pepperrell; and examples of his works are owned by Harvard and Yale Universities, by Bowdoin College, by the Massachusetts Historical Society, and by the New England Historical and Genealogical Society.

In 1734, Smibert opened a shop where he sold paint, other artist's supplies, and prints. In his studio above the shop, he displayed casts and copies of Old Masters that he had painted in Europe. This collection, which Richard Saunders has termed "America's first art gallery", provided much of the early artistic education for Charles Willson Peale, Gilbert Stuart, and John Trumbull.

Between 1740 and 1742, he served as architect for the original Faneuil Hall, which he designed in the style of an English country market. The hall burned down in 1761 but was restored, and then in 1806 greatly expanded and modified by Charles Bulfinch.

His son Nathaniel was also a painter. Smibert lies in an unmarked grave in the Granary Burying Ground in Boston.

Selected works

References

Further reading

Primary sources
 
 
General studies
 
 
Additional notes
 
 
 
 
Reference works

External links
 
John Singleton Copley in America, a full text exhibition catalog from The Metropolitan Museum of Art, which contains material on John Smibert (see index)

1688 births
1751 deaths
18th-century American painters
18th-century American male artists
American male painters
18th-century Scottish painters
Scottish male painters
Artists from Boston
People from colonial Boston
Scottish emigrants to the Thirteen Colonies
Artists from Edinburgh
Burials at Granary Burying Ground
Scottish portrait painters
American portrait painters